Antonio Blanco Freijeiro (September 6, 1923 – January 6, 1991) was a Spanish archaeologist and historian.

1923 births
1991 deaths
Complutense University of Madrid
20th-century Spanish archaeologists
20th-century Spanish  historians